CoderDojo is a global volunteer-led community of free programming workshops for young people. The movement is a grassroots organisation with individual clubs (called "Dojos") acting independently. A charity called the CoderDojo Foundation operates out of Dublin, Ireland, and supports the various clubs by providing a central website and some other support services. Supporters of CoderDojo believe it is part of the solution to addressing the global shortage of programmers by getting young people more involved with ICT learning. The movement has seen significant growth since its founding. The CoderDojo Foundation estimates 1,250 Dojos spread across 69 countries, with a growth rate of several new Dojos every week.

History 
Founded in July 2011 by James Whelton and Bill Liao, the first Dojo took place in NSC Cork, Ireland, on 23 July. James and Bill were self-taught programmers and wanted to create a space where young people could learn code in a social environment. In less than one year, the CoderDojo movement was spread across Ireland and other cities like London in England, and San Francisco in the United States.

In May 2017, Raspberry Pi foundation merged with CoderDojo.

Press Coverage 
CoderDojo received positive reviews from newspapers including BBC, CNN, The Guardian, The Irish Times and TechCrunch.

In 2015, Salesforce announced a partnership and a grant of $200,000 to CoderDojo in order to help "support 14 CoderDojo code clubs – or Dojos – globally, with each of them being run by Salesforce.com "champions".

CoderDojo Girls 
Many CoderDojo volunteers focus on improving the extreme shortage of women in technology by using specific strategies to engage girls. In particular, challenging the socially accepted idea among young women that the world of the computer sciences is "not for them". Some Dojos have even chosen to run special CoderDojo Girls sessions to encourage young women to participate in computer science. There has been some success with attracting girls into Dojos through making female mentors visible to newcomers.

CoderDojo Foundation 

Established in mid-2013 by cofounder James Whelton, the CoderDojo Foundation is focused on supporting, scaling, and empowering the CoderDojo Community. With a small core team of 6 people based in Dogpatch Labs, Dublin, Ireland, the Foundation advises new and existing Dojos, develops resources to assist Dojos, and manages international partnerships and events on behalf of the Community.

The focus is on scaling the CoderDojo movement to make coding clubs even more accessible for young people all over the world. The foundation has a stated target of encouraging 100,000 children to code regularly and having 1,500 Dojos spread across 60 countries.

See also
Ghana Code Club

References

External links
CoderDojo official website

Computer programming
Computer clubs
Irish educational websites
Recipients of the European Citizen's Prize